Natchitoches Parish ( or ) is a parish located in the U.S. state of Louisiana. As of the 2020 census, the population was 37,515. The parish seat is Natchitoches. The parish was formed in 1805.

The Natchitoches, LA Micropolitan Statistical Area includes all of Natchitoches Parish. This is the heart of the Cane River Louisiana Creole community, free people of color of mixed-race descent who settled here in the antebellum period. Their descendants continue to be Catholic and many are still French-speaking. The Cane River National Heritage Area includes the parish. Among the numerous significant historic sites in the parish is the St. Augustine Parish (Isle Brevelle) Church, a destination on the Louisiana African American Heritage Trail, founded in 2008.

Including extensive outbuildings at Magnolia and Oakland plantations, the Cane River Creole National Historical Park interprets the history and culture of the Louisiana Creoles. It is also on the Heritage Trail.

History 
Natchitoches Parish was created by the act of April 10, 1805 that divided the Territory of Orleans into 12 parishes, including Orleans, Iberville, Rapides and Natchitoches. The parish boundaries were much larger than now defined, but were gradually reduced as new parishes were organized following population increases in the state. The parishes of Caddo, Claiborne, Bossier, Webster, DeSoto, Bienville, Jackson, Sabine, Red River, Winn, and Grant were eventually formed from Natchitoches' enormous territory. Natchitoches Parish has had fifteen border revisions, making it second only to Ouachita parish in number of boundary revisions.

During the antebellum period, numerous large cotton plantations were developed in this area, worked by enslaved African Americans. The parish population was majority black and enslaved by the time of the Civil War. There was also a large mixed-race population of free Creoles of color. Among the institutions they founded was the St. Augustine Parish (Isle Brevelle) Church, built in 1829. It is a destination on the Louisiana African American Heritage Trail.

In May 1861 free men of color in the area known as Isle Brevelle began to organize two militia companies. Other free men of color of Campti and that area enlisted in the Confederate Army later in the war; and it is believed that they were accepted into a predominately white company because of their longstanding acceptance in the community. Many of the free people of color were related to longtime white families in the parish, who acknowledged them.

After the war, during Reconstruction and after, there was white violence against freedmen and their sympathizers blacks in the aftermath of emancipation and establishing a free labor system. Most planters continued to rely on cotton as a commodity crop, although the market declined, adding to area problems. In the late 19th century, a timber industry developed in some areas.

Since the late 20th century, the parish has developed considerable heritage tourism. It also attracts people for fishing and other sports, including spring training on Cane River Lake by several university teams.

Geography
It is the fourth-largest parish by land area in Louisiana. The primary groundwater resources of Natchitoches Parish, from near surface to deepest, include the Red River alluvial, upland terrace, Sparta, and Carrizo-Wilcox aquifers.

Adjacent parishes

 Bienville Parish  (north)
 Winn Parish  (northeast)
 Grant Parish  (east)
 Rapides Parish  (southeast)
 Vernon Parish  (south)
 Sabine Parish  (west)
 De Soto Parish (northwest)
 Red River Parish  (northwest)

Major highways

  Interstate 49
  U.S. Highway 71
  U.S. Highway 84
  Louisiana Highway 1
  Louisiana Highway 6
  Louisiana Highway 9
  Louisiana Highway 117
  Louisiana Highway 119
  Louisiana Highway 126
  Louisiana Highway 153
  Louisiana Highway 155
  Louisiana Highway 156
  Louisiana Highway 174
  Louisiana Highway 480
  Louisiana Highway 485
  Louisiana Highway 486
  Louisiana Highway 494
  Louisiana Highway 1226
  Louisiana Highway 3163

National protected areas

Demographics

2020 census

As of the 2020 United States census, there were 37,515 people, 14,659 households, and 7,538 families residing in the parish.

2010 census
As of the 2010 United States Census, there were 39,566 people living in the parish. 54.3% were White, 41.4% Black or African American, 1.0% Native American, 0.3% Asian, 0.9% of some other race and 2.1% of two or more races. 1.9% were Hispanic or Latino (of any race).

2000 census
As of the census of 2000, there were 39,080 people, 14,263 households, and 9,499 families living in the parish.  The population density was 31 people per square mile (12/km2).  There were 16,890 housing units at an average density of 14 per square mile (5/km2).  The racial makeup of the parish was 57.85% White, 38.43% Black or African American (42 percent in 2010), 1.08% Native American, 0.44% Asian, 0.02% Pacific Islander, 0.92% from other races, and 1.27% from two or more races.  1.45% of the population were Hispanic or Latino of any race.

There were 14,263 households, out of which 33.00% had children under the age of 18 living with them, 45.30% were married couples living together, 17.70% had a female householder with no husband present, and 33.40% were non-families. 27.10% of all households were made up of individuals, and 10.90% had someone living alone who was 65 years of age or older.  The average household size was 2.56 and the average family size was 3.14.

In the parish the population was spread out, with 26.00% under the age of 18, 17.90% from 18 to 24, 24.30% from 25 to 44, 19.70% from 45 to 64, and 12.10% who were 65 years of age or older.  The median age was 30 years. For every 100 females there were 90.60 males.  For every 100 females age 18 and over, there were 85.80 males.

The median income for a household in the parish was $25,722, and the median income for a family was $32,816. Males had a median income of $29,388 versus $19,234 for females. The per capita income for the parish was $13,743.  About 20.90% of families and 26.50% of the population were below the poverty line, including 32.70% of those under age 18 and 19.00% of those age 65 or over.

Politics
Until the late 20th century, Natchitoches Parish was reliably Democratic in most competitive elections. But the party affiliations have changed, and like most of the Deep South, have a distinct ethnic and demographic character. Since African Americans achieved certain gains under civil rights legislation and have been enabled to vote again since the late 1960s, they have supported the Democratic Party. Most white conservatives have left that party, and affiliated with the Republican Party, as has been obvious in parish results in presidential elections since 2000. These results reflect the demographic breakdown of the parish, where whites comprise a slight majority.

The last Democrat to win in Natchitoches Parish at the presidential level was native son of the South, Bill Clinton from Arkansas in 1996, who received 8,296 votes (54.7 percent), compared to Republican Robert J. Dole's 5,471 ballots (36.1 percent). Ross Perot of the Reform Party attracted 1,053 votes (6.9 percent).

In his first and disputed election of 2000, Bush topped then Vice President Al Gore in Natchitoches Parish, 7,332 (49.4 percent) to 6,924 (46.6 percent). Patrick J. Buchanan as the Reform Party nominee, received 271 votes (1.8 percent).

U.S. Senator John McCain of Arizona won Natchitoches Parish over Barack Obama in the 2008 general election, 9,054 votes (53.1 percent) to 7,801 votes (45.7 percent). The 2004 presidential results in Natchitoches Parish were similar to those of 2008 and 2012, with U.S. President George W. Bush prevailing over U.S. Senator John F. Kerry, 9,261 (54.6 percent) to 7,398 (43.6 percent).

In 2012, Republican presidential nominee Mitt Romney won the parish with 9,077 votes (52.6 percent) to U.S. President Barack Obama's 7,942 votes (46 percent). At the parish-level, former State Representative Rick Nowlin, a Republican, became the first elected president of the new Natchitoches Parish government, which replaces the former Natchitoches Parish Police Jury system. Nowlin received 9,283 votes (59.2 percent) to the Democrat Gerald "Jerry" Longlois' 6,393 (40.8 percent). Natchitoches Parish cast 73 percent of its ballots for Republican U.S. Representative John Fleming, who faced opposition only from a Libertarian Party candidate.

Education
Natchitoches Parish School Board operates local public schools.

Parish schools include:
Cloutierville Elementary & Junior High School,
East Natchitoches Elementary & Middle High School,
Fairview Alpha Elementary & Junior High School,
Frankie Ray Jackson, Sr. Technical Center,
George L. Parks Elementary & Junior High School,
Goldonna Elementary & Junior High School,
L.P. Vaughn Elementary & Junior High School,
Lakeview High School,
M.R. Weaver Elementary,
Marthaville Elementary & Junior High School,
Natchitoches Central High School,
Natchitoches Magnet School,
NSU Elementary Laboratory School,
NSU Middle Laboratory School, and
Provencal Elementary & Junior High School.

It is in the service area of Bossier Parish Community College.

Government

National Guard
A Troop 2-108TH CAV is headquartered in behind the local college and the airport.  This unit has deployed twice to Iraq, first as part of the 1-156TH Armor Battalion in 2004-2005 and then as part of the 2-108TH CAV SQDN in 2010. Both times this company sized element deployed with the 256th Infantry Brigade.

Communities

City 
 Natchitoches (parish seat and largest municipality)

Town
 Campti

Villages

 Ashland
 Clarence
 Goldonna
 Natchez
 Powhatan (smallest municipality)
 Provencal
 Robeline

Unincorporated areas

Census-designated places 

 Point Place
 Vienna Bend

Other unincorporated communities 

 Ajax
 Allen
 Bellwood
 Bermuda
 Bethel
 Chestnut
 Chopin
 Cypress
 Cloutierville
 Creston
 Derry
 Fairview Acres
 Fairview Alpha (also in Red River Parish)
 Flora
 Gorum
 Grand Ecore
 Grappes Bluff
 Hagewood
 Irma
 Janie
 Kile
 King Hill
 Marthaville
 Melrose
 Mink
 Mora
 Pleasant Hill
 Readhimer
 Timon
 Victoria
 Vowells Mill
 Westlake

Hospital

 Natchitoches Regional Medical Center (formerly Natchitoches Parish Hospital) owns 96 beds, serving for Natchitoches, Sabine and Winn Parishes.

Prison
Parish

Notable people
 H. Welborn Ayres (1900–1985), born in Ashland, judge of the Louisiana Third Judicial District Court in Jonesboro and the Second Circuit Court of Appeal in Shreveport
 Curtis Boozman (1898-1979), member of the Louisiana House of Representatives from Natchitoches (two terms: 1952–1956 and 1960–1964).
 Leopold Caspari (1830-1915), merchant in Cloutierville from 1849 to 1858 and thereafter businessman and banker in Natchitoches. He served nonconsecutively in both houses of the Louisiana State Legislature between 1884 and 1914.
 Monnie T. Cheves (1902-1988), Northwestern State University professor; member of the Louisiana House of Representatives from 1952 to 1960
 Charles Milton Cunningham (1877-1936), educator, lawyer, police juror, state senator, editor of The Natchitoches Times
 William Tharp Cunningham (1871-1952), planter, lawyer, judge of the 11th Judicial District in Natchitoches and Red River parishes, member of the Louisiana House of Representatives from 1908 to 1912, born in Natchitoches Parish in 1871
 Numa T. Delouche (1888-1965), member of the Louisiana House of Representatives from Cloutierville from 1944 to 1948, served alongside Sylvan Friedman of Natchez, Louisiana.
 Caroline Dormon (1888–1971), naturalist, botanist, and preservationist; born and lived on her family estate of Briarwood in Natchitoches Parish.
 Abraham Dowden, Democratic political figure.
 Brothers J. Isaac Friedman (1877-1949) and Leon Friedman (1886-1948) served in the Louisiana House from 1908 to 1916 and 1932 to 1940, respectively. Isaac Friedman also completed two years of a term in the state senate (1922 to 1924), following the resignation of Charles Milton Cunningham. Their nephew, Sylvan Friedman was a member of both houses of the state legislature, serving in the House from 1944 to 1952, and the state senate from 1952 to 1972. The Friedmans came from a large Jewish landholding family in Natchez, Louisiana.
 Thomas Gilcrease (1890–1962), born in Robeline. He moved as a child with his parents in 1899 to the community of Wealaka in the Creek Nation in Indian Territory, now eastern Oklahoma. Later an oilman and an art collector, he founded the Gilcrease Museum, which he later donated to Tulsa.
 Lloyd Hendrick (1908-1951), member of the state senate for DeSoto and Caddo parishes, 1940 to 1948; born in Natchitoches Parish.
 Andrew R. Johnson (1856–1933), Louisiana state senator and former mayor of Homer, Louisiana, in 1901 named and sold lots to establish the village of Ashland in Natchitoches Parish.
 Bob Reese (1929-2004), co-chairman of the Natchitoches Parish Republican Executive Committee, 1968–2004.
 Roy Sanders (1904-1976), educator who served from Natchitoches Parish in the Louisiana House of Representatives from 1948 to 1952
 Ray Tarver (1921-1972), dentist from Natchitoches who represented Natchitoches Parish in the Louisiana House from 1964 to 1968; reared in Hagewood community in Natchitoches Parish

See also

 National Register of Historic Places listings in Natchitoches Parish, Louisiana

References

External links

 
 

 
Louisiana parishes
Louisiana African American Heritage Trail
Louisiana placenames of Native American origin
1805 establishments in the Territory of Orleans
Populated places established in 1805
Ark-La-Tex